The Saturn Relay is a minivan that was made by General Motors. It was introduced for the 2005 model year, and was built alongside badge engineered variants, the Buick Terraza, the Chevrolet Uplander, and the Pontiac Montana SV6 in Doraville, Georgia.

The Relay was introduced with a 3.5 L LX9 V6 that generates  and  torque, going from 0-60 mph in the 9-second range. For 2006, a 3.9 L LZ9 V6, with 240 hp (179 kW) and 240 lb·ft (332 Nm) torque, was added as an option, which delivered faster acceleration and better response than the 3.5L engine. For 2007, the 3.5 L V6 was dropped, leaving the 3.9 L as the base engine. Consequently, the optional AWD system was also dropped, since it could not handle the torque of the 3.9 L engine. Also in 2007, the Relay received an optional flex-fuel engine but only for fleet applications. The Relay scored three "Good"s (the highest possible score) and two "acceptable"s (the second highest possible score) in Insurance Institute for Highway Safety (IIHS) crash tests. In terms of gas mileage, the Relay is rated at  city,  highway.

The Relay started at US$22,850. There were three available trim levels, 1, 2, 3. The Relay 3 was available in front-wheel drive and in all-wheel drive. All Relays seat seven via folding/removable 2nd row captains chairs and a 50/50 third-row bench. The third-row bench folds flat, but did not fold entirely into the floor. OnStar assistance and a DVD rear entertainment system came standard on all Relays. A navigation system was optional on Relay 3s. Side airbags were optional on the Relay. The Relay was discontinued after the 2007 model year and was replaced by the 2007 Saturn Outlook.

Changes

2005
The Saturn Relay is introduced in 2005, along with the other GM minivans shared on the same platform.

2006
2006 models added the GM logos on the front doors. Like the other GM minivans on the General Motors U platform, the wheels were updated from a five lugnut design to a 6 lugnut design.

2007
The final model year of the Relay. The Saturn logos had been dropped from the front doors, and the all-wheel drive option was no longer available. The Relay was discontinued after the 2007 model year. The Doraville Assembly plant closed in September 2008. The final 2007 Relay rolled off the line on November 17, 2006. The Relay was replaced by the  Saturn Outlook, an 8-passenger crossover SUV riding on the General Motors Lambda platform.

Sales

See also 
 Relay (disambiguation)

References

External links

Official American site
Official Canadian site
GMC to add minivan, GM to discontinue others.

All-wheel-drive vehicles
Front-wheel-drive vehicles
Minivans
Relay
Flexible-fuel vehicles
Cars introduced in 2005
Motor vehicles manufactured in the United States